Bryan Lundquist (born May 30, 1985) is an American competition swimmer from Marietta, Georgia.

He was a member of the U.S. men's relay that established a new world record in the short course meters 400 Free Relay at the 2008 FINA Short Course World Championships.

He placed 7th at the 2008 US Olympic Swimming Trials in Omaha, Nebraska in the 50m Freestyle.

On July 18, 2009, while swimming at the U.S. Swimming Sectionals in Knoxville, Tennessee, Bryan established a new American Record in the 50 meter butterfly with a time of 22.91, becoming the first American to swim under 23 seconds in the event.

Bryan attended Lassiter High School in Marietta, Georgia, and was a member of the Stingrays Swimming club team. He swam collegiately for Auburn University, where he was a member of four consecutive National Championship teams. He is the son of Gordon and Debbie Lundquist - both longtime Florida Gators fans.

See also
 List of Auburn University people
 World record progression 4 × 100 metres freestyle relay

External links
 BryanLundquist.com
 Player Bio
 FOXNews

1985 births
Living people
Auburn Tigers men's swimmers
American male freestyle swimmers
American male butterfly swimmers
World record setters in swimming
Swimmers at the 2011 Pan American Games
Medalists at the FINA World Swimming Championships (25 m)
Universiade medalists in swimming
Universiade gold medalists for the United States
Medalists at the 2007 Summer Universiade
Pan American Games competitors for the United States
20th-century American people
21st-century American people